Devonwall was a political concept introduced in the United Kingdom in the 1970s by the Conservative government. It was an attempt to link Cornwall and Devon together in an economic, political and statistical sense to form a South West region. This involved combining and centralising some local government functions and services such as the police, ambulance, fire services and media output such as local TV and newspapers.

History
The Liberal Democrats supported this process until the late 1990s. The process was opposed by the Cornish political party Mebyon Kernow and did not receive widespread support from the Cornish public. After the 1997 general election the Liberal Democrat partly withdrew their support as they said that they agreed that the 'Devonwall' process undermined Cornwall's claims to European Objective One funding. Cornish demands for Objective One grant aid in the early 1990s for regeneration were often dismissed by Government officials as unrealistic and unobtainable. but this ignored the fact that of the 56 most deprived areas in Devon and Cornwall, 51 were in Cornwall. Cornwall also had less than 75% of the average European GDP but these statistics were hidden when statistically Cornwall and Devon (with a higher GDP) were linked together. There were also claims that 'Devonwall' was an attempt by politicians to hijack the Cornish Celtic identity.

In 1998 Cornwall was recognised by the UK Government as having "distinct cultural and historical factors reflecting a Celtic background", thus allowing it to be separated in a regional and economic sense from Devon. This fact underlines the importance of Celticity to Cornwall in recent years. In July 2000 Mebyon Kernow issued the "Declaration for a Cornish Assembly".

"Cornwall is a distinct region. It has a clearly defined economic, administrative and social profile. Cornwall's unique identity reflects its Celtic character, culture and environment. We declare that the people of Cornwall will be best served in their future governance by a Cornish regional assembly. We therefore commit ourselves to setting up the Cornish Constitutional Convention with the intention of achieving a devolved Cornish Assembly–Senedh Kernow."

Objective One funding
Between 2000 and 2006, £350 million of Objective One funding was made available to Cornwall and the next 'tranche' (called Convergence funding) will last between the beginning of 2008 to 2013 and will be worth £445 million. There have been many complaints from Cornish people that the management of the Objective One investment is largely controlled from outside Cornwall., by the South West Regional Development Agency (SWRDA), in Exeter and Bristol. Cornwall is the only Objective One region in the UK and Europe where the project is administered from outside the region.

Today many Cornish organisations such as Mebyon Kernow, Cornish Solidarity, the Liberal Democrats, the Cornish Constitutional Convention and Conservative PPCs and independent councillors still campaign against the 'Devonwall' concept and are in favour of Cornwall being run as a distinct cultural, economic and administrative region with its own assembly.

There was renewed opposition to "Devonwall" in Cornwall in 2010, when the new government announced that local enterprise partnerships will replace regional development agencies. Devon County Council and Devon-based business interests, including the media, wanted to join with Cornwall to form a "Devonwall" LEP, but there was widespread opposition to this in Cornwall., with Cornwall Council favouring a Cornwall and Isles of Scilly LEP.

Possible Parliamentary constituency

Further opposition arose in 2010 to a cross-border parliamentary constituency, dubbed a "Devonwall" constituency, as part of the coalition government's plans to reform the electoral boundaries. It was condemned by Mebyon Kernow and the Keep Cornwall Whole campaign, who planned protests in Saltash by the boundary of the historical division between Devon and Cornwall, one of which took place in October 2010. It was announced in September 2011 that the proposed new seat would include Bude in North Cornwall and Bideford in West Devon. The idea resurfaced following the Conservative party victory in the 2015 UK general election, within which they took every Cornish seat.

See also

Economy of Cornwall
Cornish nationalism

References

External links
KEEP DEVON OUT OF CORNWALL 'devonwall'
Mebyon Kernow oppose 'devonwall'
Church to form a new Diocese of 'devonwall' ?
Cornish Assembly oppose 'devonwall' policies

Politics of Cornwall
Cornish nationalism
Politics of Devon
Regions of England